Grand Buffet is a hip-hop funk duo from Pittsburgh, Pennsylvania, made up of Jackson O'Connell-Barlow (stage names: Iguanadon, Grape-a-Don, Plaps, Nate Kukla, and Mr. Pennsylvania) and Jarrod Weeks (stage names: M-Dog, Lord Grunge, Viceroy, Matt Kukla, Fred Durts).  Their music is a unique brand of humorous, often satirical rap.  They have toured several times with notable artists such as Gil Mantera's Party Dream, Sage Francis, Of Montreal, Cex, Sole, Magnolia Electric Co., Streetlight Manifesto, and the late Wesley Willis.  They have also toured the United States and Europe extensively.  In 2005 they finished a European tour with Sage Francis, and an American Tour with Of Montreal and MGMT in 2006. They toured with Girl Talk in 2008, and Third Eye Blind in 2009.

History 
Grand Buffet has been together since 1996, meeting at Hampton High School in Allison Park. They have released two self-produced, full-length LP's, Scrooge McRock (1997, out of print) and Sparkle Classic (2000), as well as a "Trilogy of Terror": 3 EP's - Undercover Angels (2002), Cigarette Beach (2002), and Pittsburgh Hearts (2003). Each of these releases has included different names for Jackson and Jarrod in the liner notes; the stage names are listed chronologically from Scrooge McRock to Cigarette Beach - Pittsburgh Hearts attributed them by their real names. 
Their MySpace account also lists them as Viceroy (Jarrod) and Plaps (Jackson). There was a third member, a DJ named G-Rude (Dan Grudovich), who was credited on Scrooge McRock but no subsequent albumsthus the liner art for both Scrooge McRock and Dicer contains three member's pictures instead of two. In 2004, they released a full-length CD of outtakes, rarities, and radio performances called Dicer: The Unheard Funk Tracks. In 2005, they released a greatest hits collection, Five Years of Fireworks, which included a new track and a bonus DVD filled with music videos, outtakes, backstage antics, and live material. A sequel to Dicer was announced in 2005, and Weeks mentioned possibly expanding it into an annual release. It is notable to mention that they once again toured with a DJ for some shows in 2005 and 2006; a DJ from Texas, DJ Jester the Filipino Fist, who has toured with Kid Koala.

On May 8, 2007, "The Haunted Fucking Gazebo" EP and on January 8, 2008, "King Vision" were released, both on Fighting Records.

Abandoned and unreleased material 
The band has distanced itself from Scrooge McRock in at least one interview, dismissing it as more of a retrospectively-viewed collection of demos than a proper album. For the following two years, they worked on material for an album that was to be called Peter Weller (after the actor), which ultimately was never released, culminating in its abandonment in 1999. (Several tracks from these sessions were released on Dicer).  Sparkle Classic is the first album they consider part of the official discography.

Grand Buffet have hinted at a children's album entitled Gorilla and Fox, but there has been no official release date announced.

Discography 
 High Grabber - 1996, self-released demo tape
 Scrooge McRock - 1997, out of print LP
 Height - Height - 2000, guest appearance on "String Game"
 Sparkle Classic - 2000, LP
 Circuits of Steel - 2002, compilation; contributed track "Murphy" (now available in DICER)
 Trilogy of Terror EPs - 2002-2003, EPs
 Undercover Angels - 2002, EP
 Cigarette Beach - 2002, EP
 Pittsburgh Hearts - 2003, EP
 Grand Buffet Presents... Karaoke (on CDR!) - 2003, Jackson's Collection
 Dicer: The Unheard Funk Tracks - 2004, B-sides collection
 Five Years of Fireworks - 2005, Greatest hits collection with bonus DVD
 Bloom - Untitled remix LP - 2005, Remix of "Remote Control"
 Height -  Utility Fog - 2006, Guest appearance on "Going Down Big"
 A Night of Laughin! Volume 1 - 2006, Contains various stand-up comedy sets with Jackson and Jarrod making fun of the comics in the background.  Signed, limited edition run of 100; available only at shows.  Disc itself labeled "A Night of Laughs!"  Sold out.
 Circuits of Steel II -2007 Jackson and Lord Grunge contribute solo songs, "Holy shit! Yikes!" and "Frosty Anchors"
 The Haunted Fucking Gazebo  - May 8, 2007, EP
 Escape From Anthony Baboon's Nautical Playhouse The Sample Based Remixes - 2008
 King Vision - 2008, LP
 Gorilla and Fox - Unknown release date, children's album

Videography 
"Candy Bars" (2000)
"Pink Deadly" (2002)
"Cool As Hell" (2004)
Five Years of Fireworks DVD (2005)
Grand Buffet are featured in the 2003 German documentary Golden Lemons by Jörg Siepmann about a Wesley Willis tour supported by the German band Die Goldenen Zitronen (The Golden Lemons) and Grand Buffet.

References

American hip hop groups
Musical groups from Pittsburgh